Software implementation may refer to:

 Software implementation, a specific piece of software together with its features and quality aspects
 Programming language implementation
 Software construction
 Computer programming

See also
 Product software implementation method
 Software features
 Software quality
 Reference implementation, software from which all other implementations are derived